The Volvo B58 was a mid-engined bus chassis manufactured by Volvo in Sweden from 1966 until early 1982. It was succeeded by the B10M.

Operators
In the United Kingdom, it was sold to many major operators including Wallace Arnold and Park's of Hamilton from 1972. Many of the Volvo B58s in the United Kingdom were built as coaches. One Volvo B58 was rebodied as a double-decker bus with East Lancs Droop Nose double-decker bus body for Skills Coaches.

In 1978, Greater Stockholm Transport Authority ordered 250 B58s.

Until November 2009, GO Wellington in New Zealand operated 68 Volvo B58 trolleybuses.

In Brazil, The Volvo B58 (named the B58E) was built in Curitiba from 1979 to 1998. It was used in city buses, including trolleybuses, and road coaches, in cities like São Paulo, Curitiba, Porto Alegre, Campinas, Sorocaba and Belo Horizonte. Also, in 1992, B58E was Brazil's first bi-articulated chassis, and the first 33 operated in Curitiba as Express Line Buses.

Chassis of this model of Brazilian origin were built by the companies Caio, Ciferal and Thamco to be sent to Montevideo, Uruguay both before and after the launch of the "National Renewal Plan" of the fleet for the companies CUTCSA, COETC, UCOT and Raincoop, CUTCSA acquiring some 260 (10 in 1990, 18 in 1991 before the "National Plan for Fleet Renewal" that were built by CUTCSA itself in Uruguay, 175 after its launch in 1993 and 57 in 1994) cars with CAIO Vitória bodywork that would be radiated between 2008 (one of these cassis had its Engine removed and used in a Brill Model 60 motorcar as a replacemebt for the Cummins Diesel Engine used in the 1960s as a replacement of its original Gasoline Engine it had) and 2015 when the ex-UCOT units acquired in 2002, COETC that acquired a total of 153 cars with Ciferal Padron Rio bodywork(two batches of 14 and 38 cars in 1992, 83 in 1993, 6 in 1994 and 5 in 1996) that have been serviced between 2008 and 2022, UCOT acquired 118 chassis with CAIO Vitória bodies (in a total renewal of the fleet) that They were disaffected and referred to multiple destinations between In 2001(these cars would all be sold to CUTCSA or Raincoop) and 2012, keeping some as substitutes, Raincoop acquired 91 cars with CAIO Vitória bodies (15 for suburban use between 1992 and 1993, 15 urban in 1992, 55 urban in 1993 and 6 urban ones in 1994) these were maintained until 2011 where they were radiated from service in a renovation completed in 2012 with some ex-UCOT acquired in 2002 Remaining in the company until its closure in 2016, in 1993 some 18 B58E chassis were built for Raincoop by Thamco in the Scorpion TH3250USS model that would be discontinued between 2008 and the cooperative's closure in 2016 With car 100 passing into the hands of Erhitran (association dedicated to the conservation of the heritage of the Uruguayan bus), Raincoop acquired a last chassis of this model in 1998 for its suburban lines that was bodied with Marcopolo Allegro GV; Two companies from the interior of Uruguay acquired a chassis of this model for urban and suburban use, these being Olivera Hnos. from Maldonado, who bought 10 units for bodywork woth CAIO Vitória bodywork that would pass into the hands of CODESA in their merger. while in the city of Las Piedras of the Canelones Department the company CODET acquired 11 with CAIO Vitória "Intercity" bodywork in 1992 and another 10 in 1993 with two addition acquisitions done of second-hand vehicles from Solfy SA, being 2 Marcopolo Allegro G4 in 1997 and 4 Marcopolo Allegro GV in 1998 with all of them becoming the property of COETC on August 1, 2007, with the merger between both companies being deactivated between 2008 and 2011; the interdepartmental company CITA S.A also had cars with Volvo B58E chassis with the last one ceasing its services in 2018

In Australia the B58 was popular with government operators. ACTION, placed 77 in service between 1972 and 1976, the Metropolitan Transport Trust, Tasmania 68 rigid buses and three articulated buses from September 1975,
and the State Transport Authority, Adelaide 65 rigids and 35 articulateds from April 1980.

The chassis also found a market with Australian private operators. Forest Coach Lines purchased 13 between 1972 and 1984, Busways 30 between 1978 and 1981, and Grenda Corporation 18 between 1980 and 1983. All supplemented their fleets with second hand purchases.

References

External links

Articulated buses
Bi-articulated buses
Bus chassis
Coaches (bus)
Double-decker buses
Step-entrance buses
Tri-axle buses
Trolleybuses
Vehicles introduced in 1966
B58